The French Republic has terrestrial borders with 10 sovereign states, 8 bordering Metropolitan France and 2 bordering the Overseas Departments of France, totaling . In addition, the territories of France border an additional 5 countries and territories.

List
The lengths of the borders France shares with different countries and territories are listed below. Maritime borders are not all included.

Metropolitan France

Overseas Departments/Regions

Overseas Collectives/Territories

References